Bayshore Christian School is a private Christian school in central Tampa, Florida, United States, providing education for children from pre-kindergarten to grade 12. The school was founded as a middle school in 1971 as a segregation academy when the court ordered racial integration of public schools required white middle school children to be bused to formerly black schools. According to the National Center for Education Statistics, the school reported a diversity rate of approximately 40% during the 2017–2018 school year.

As of 2012, the school served 226 students, 62 of whom were at the high school level. The student-teacher ratio was 11.6.

History
In a 1992 interview, principal Herman Valdes acknowledged the school was established in response to desegregation bussing.

Athletics 
Bayshore Christian has won FHSAA state championships in volleyball four times.

References

External links

Christian schools in Florida
High schools in Hillsborough County, Florida
Private middle schools in Florida
Private high schools in Florida
Educational institutions established in 1971
1971 establishments in Florida
Segregation academies in Florida
High schools in Tampa, Florida